Michael Ableman is an American-Canadian author, organic farmer, educator, and advocate for sustainable agriculture. Michael has been farming organically since the early 1970s and is considered one of the pioneers of the organic farming and urban agriculture movements. He is a frequent lecturer to audiences all over the world and the winner of numerous awards for his work. Ableman is the author of four trade published books: From the Good Earth: A celebration of growing food around the world; On Good Land: The autobiography of an urban farm; A farmer's journey in search of real food and the people who grow it, and most recently Street Farm; Growing Food, Jobs, and Hope on the Urban Frontier. Michael Ableman is the founder of the Center for Urban Agriculture at Fairview Gardens in Goleta, California where he farmed for 20 years; co-founder and director of Sole Food Street Farms and the charity Cultivate Canada in Vancouver, British Columbia; and founder and director of the Center for Arts, Ecology and Agriculture based at his family home and farm on Salt Spring Island.

Biography
Ableman originally intended to become a photographer. However, in 1972 he joined an agrarian commune east of Ojai, California where he was to eventually manage  of pear and apple orchards. After a time managing a nursery on the coast north of Santa Barbara, in 1981 Ableman took a job grafting orange trees at Fairview Gardens.  When the previous manager left, Ableman remained, "farm-sitting," until 2001. At its peak the farm served as an important community and education center and a national model for small-scale and urban agriculture, hosting as many as 5000 people per year for tours, classes, festivals, and apprenticeships. Under Ableman's leadership, the farm was saved from development and preserved under one of the earliest and most unusual active agricultural conservation easements of its type in the country.

A frequent speaker at conferences throughout North America, Ableman gave a plenary presentation on the future of farming at the Bioneers conference in 2005.

Ableman lives with his family on an organic farm on Saltspring Island, British Columbia.
Ableman now lives and farms at the historic 120-acre Foxglove Farm where he also directs the Center For Arts, Ecology, and Agriculture.

Michael, co-founded North America's largest Urban Agriculture project, Sole Food Street Farms in Vancouver, British Columbia.  Sole Food transforms vacant urban land into street farms that grow artisan quality fruits and vegetables and provides jobs to residents in the downtown Eastside of Vancouver who faces for whatever reason challenges to employment.

Beginning with a half-acre parking lot on Hastings and Hawks streets on the downtown east-side of Vancouver, the project established urban production farms throughout Vancouver that employed individuals working through the challenges of material poverty, addiction, and mental illness while generating large quantities of food.

Foxglove Farm
Foxglove Farm is a 120-acre organic farm on Salt Spring Island in British Columbia, Canada owned by Ableman. Foxglove Farm is home to the Centre for Arts, Ecology and Agriculture which specializes in agricultural and culinary arts workshops.

Works
 Street Farm: Growing Food, Jobs, and Hope on the Urban Frontier. Chelsea Green (2016)  
 Fields of Plenty: A Farmer's Journey in Search of Real Food and the People Who Grow It. Chronicle Books (2005). 
 On Good Land: The Autobiography of an Urban Farmer. Chronicle Books (1998). 
 From the Good Earth: A Celebration of Growing Food Around the World, with Cynthia Wisehart, Sam Bittman. Harry N. Abrams, Incorporated, (1993).

See also
Clara Whitehill Hunt
Lawrence Fraser Abbott
Adeline Pond Adams

References

External links
 Ableman's website.

Living people
Year of birth missing (living people)
American agricultural writers
Organic farmers
Sustainable agriculture
Sustainability advocates